Sergei Dorofeyev (born August 26, 1986) is a Russian professional ice hockey defenceman who is currently playing with Severstal Cherepovets in the Kontinental Hockey League (KHL).

References

External links

1986 births
Living people
Amur Khabarovsk players
Metallurg Novokuznetsk players
HC MVD players
Russian ice hockey defencemen
Severstal Cherepovets players
Ice hockey people from Moscow